Swindon Borough Council is the local authority of the Borough of Swindon in Wiltshire, England. It is a unitary authority, having the powers of a non-metropolitan county and district council combined. As such, it is administratively separate from the rest of Wiltshire. It was formed in 1997, replacing Thamesdown Borough Council.

Powers, functions and operations 
The local authority derives its powers and functions from the Local Government Act 1972 and subsequent legislation. For the purposes of local government, Swindon Borough is a non-metropolitan area of England. As a unitary authority, Swindon Borough Council has the powers and functions of both a non-metropolitan county and district council. In its capacity as a district council it is a billing authority collecting Council Tax and business rates, it processes local planning applications, and it is responsible for housing, waste collection and environmental health. In its capacity as a county council it is a local education authority, responsible for social services, libraries and waste disposal.

Since 2010, many schools in the area have become academies, with the council losing control. It was also the owner of Swindon's main bus operator, Thamesdown Transport, until 2017 when it sold the business to the Go-Ahead Group due to issues with funding. Maintenance services are usually contracted to Swindon Commercial Services (SCS), who work in partnership with the council.

The council's principal decision-making body is its cabinet, which comprises the leader and  nine portfolio-holding members.

Elections 

Fifty-seven councillors are elected by the borough's 20 wards for four-year terms. Approximately one-third of the council stands for election in rotation every year for three consecutive years, and in the fourth year there are no elections.

Wards and councillors

Notes

References

External links 
 
 Your Councillors at Swindon Borough Council

Borough of Swindon
Unitary authority councils of England
Local education authorities in England
Local authorities in Wiltshire
Billing authorities in England
Leader and cabinet executives